Headgear is padded helmet worn during sparring in the martial arts.

Boxing
In June 2013 AIBA repealed mandatory headgear for amateur elite male boxers (19–40 years old).

Headgear is a padded helmet, worn on the head by contestants in Amateur and Olympic boxing. It effectively protects against cuts, scrapes, and swelling, but it does not protect very well against concussions. It will not protect the brain from the jarring that occurs when the head is struck.  Also, most boxers aim for the chin on opponents, and the chin is usually not protected by headgear.

There are different types of boxing headgear available.  Some headgear is open-faced.  This is the style normally used in amateur boxing competitions.  Unlike open-faced headgear, training headgear covers the cheek.  "Face-saver" headgear features a pad across the face so that no direct contact is made to the face.  As the amount of padding in headgear is increased, visibility is reduced.

Boxing Headgear will reduce the impact of a hit by 40-60%.

It has lately been noted that the use of headgear might in fact be less safe than not using it due to an increased rate of brain damage, particularly outside professional boxing. Due to this, headguards were not used in the 2016 Summer Olympics. There are three theories for why use of headgear might lead to more brain damage: the headguard makes it more difficult to see, it makes ones head a bigger target and it might create a false sense of security, leading the boxer to take more risks than they otherwise might. As such, use of 16oz gloves has become more recommended to increase the safety of boxing, as they are heavy enough to prevent the boxer from throwing punches at full speed and power.

Wrestling
Wrestling headgear is designed to protect the ears from damage.  It features either soft or hard plastic ear covers and straps around the chin and back of the head. It is commonly used in grappling sports such as amateur wrestling, submission wrestling and Brazilian jiu-jitsu.

Point fighting
Point fighting headgear, which is commonly required in sport karate tournaments is made of a molded and dipped foam.  This type of headgear is most common in no contact and semi contact fighting.  It is designed to protect against accidental impact, including the head hitting the floor after a slip or knockdown. This sort of headgear can be open face, full faced and sometimes even a full plastic face shield.

See also

Sportswear (activewear)

References

Martial arts equipment
Headgear
Sportswear
Protective gear